Namdalseid is a former municipality in Trøndelag county, Norway. The municipality existed from 1838 until its dissolution in 2020 when it joined Namsos Municipality. It was part of the Namdalen region. The administrative centre of the municipality was the village of Namdalseid. Other villages and farm areas in the municipality included Sjøåsen, Statland, Tøttdalen, and Sverkmoen.

At the time of its dissolution in 2020, the  municipality was the 144th largest by area out of the 422 municipalities in Norway. Namdalseid was the 348th most populous municipality in Norway with a population of 1,585.

General information
The parish of Namdalseid was established as a municipality on 1 January 1838 (see formannskapsdistrikt), but it was merged into the neighboring municipality of Beitstad on 1 January 1846. On 1 January 1904, the Namdalseid district (population: 1,368) was separated from Beitstad to form a municipality of its own (once again).

During the 1960s, there were many municipal mergers across Norway due to the work of the Schei Committee.  On 1 January 1964, the parts of the neighboring municipality of Otterøy that were located south of the Namsenfjorden (population: 571) were transferred to Namdalseid municipality.  On 1 January 2018, the municipality switched from the old Nord-Trøndelag county to the new Trøndelag county.

On 1 January 2020, the neighboring municipalities of Fosnes, Namsos, and Namdalseid merged to form a new, larger Namsos Municipality. This occurred because on 16 June 2016, the three municipalities voted to merge as part of a large municipal reform across Norway.

Name
The municipality (originally the parish) is named Namdalseid. This name originally comes from the old Elda farm ( or commonly shortened to ) since the first Eid Stave Church was built there. The Vikings used to drag boats across Namdalseid using the rivers and waterways in the area, to get from one fjord to another without having to risk crossing the treacherous Folda fjord by travelling up the sheltered Trondheimsfjord and continuing north along the coast. The passage was much easier in olden times as the sea level was higher and the waterways more numerous, but as recently as 2004 a boatdrag was done to commemorate the old traditions. Nowadays, however, one has to transport the boats by road for a fairly long stretch. Around the year 1550, the prefix  was added to the name to distinguish it from other places using the common name Eid. The prefix is the genitive case of the old region name Namdalen.

Coat of arms
The coat of arms was granted on 8 December 1989 and they were in use until 1 January 2020 when the municipality was dissolved. The official blazon is "Per pale trefly-counter-trefly argent and vert". This means the arms have a field (background) that is divided vertically by a line that follows a trefoil/clover design that alternates on either side of the line. The background on the left side of the line has a tincture of argent which means it is commonly colored white, but if it is made out of metal, then silver is used. The background on the right side has a tincture of green. The clover leaf shapes and the colors were chosen to symbolize the agriculture, landscapes, and nature within the municipality. Namdalseid was a farming municipality with mainly grass production. The municipal flag has the same design as the coat of arms.

Churches
The Church of Norway had two parishes within the municipality of Namdalseid. It is part of the Nord-Innherad prosti (deanery) in the Diocese of Nidaros.

Geography
The municipality bordered the municipalities of Flatanger, Roan, and Osen to the west; Namsos to the north; Åfjord and Verran to the southwest; and Steinkjer to the southeast. Lakes in the region include Gilten and Finnvollvatnet. The river Sverka runs through the western part of the municipality. The Namsenfjorden formed most of the northern border.

Government
While it existed, this municipality was responsible for primary education (through 10th grade), outpatient health services, senior citizen services, unemployment and other social services, zoning, economic development, and municipal roads. During its existence, this municipality was governed by a municipal council of elected representatives, which in turn elected a mayor. The municipality fell under the Namdal District Court and the Frostating Court of Appeal.

Municipal council
The municipal council of Namdalseid is made up of 19 representatives that are elected to four year terms. The party breakdown of the final municipal council was as follows:

Mayors
The mayors of Namdalseid:

1838–1839: Erich Helbostad 
1840–1841: Christian Gotfred Vogelsang 
1842–1845: Morten Elden
1904–1906: Paul Anzjøn 	
1907-1907: Kristoffer Elden 	
1908–1910: Henrik Elden 	
1911–1913: John Buvarp 	
1914–1916: Håkon Holien (V)
1917–1922: Tønnes Silset (V)
1923–1925: Sverre Elden (Bp)
1926–1931: Tønnes Silset (Bp)
1932–1934: Olav Sæther (V)
1935–1937: Tønnes Silset (Bp)
1938–1940: Edmund Buvarp (V)
1941-1941: Tønnes Silset (NS)
1942-1942: Kristian Anzjøn (NS)
1943-1943: Edvard Stamnes (NS)
1944–1945: Oldus Mork (NS)
1945–1946: Edmund Buvarp (V)
1947-1947: Eiliv Elden (Bp)
1948–1951: Trygve Silset (Bp)
1952–1959: Inge Kaldahl (Bp)
1960–1964: Asbjørn Kaldahl (Sp)
1964–1968: Otto Ekker (Sp)
1968–1972: Inge Kaldahl (Sp)
1972–1983: Einar Furre (Sp)
1984–1987: Per Arve Lie (V)
1988–1995: Bjørn Hagen (Ap)
1995–1999: Hetty Vårdal (Ap)
1999–2003: Per Arve Lie (V)
2003–2019: Steinar Lyngstad (Sp)

Economy
Being mainly an agricultural municipality, Namdalseid struggled with a decline in population, as fewer and fewer people find they can make a living growing crops and raising cattle. Other areas of interest for business were fishing, hunting, and nature. Having one of the best small-salmon (grisle) rivers in Trøndelag, Namdalseid is a haven for fly fishing and attracts many fishermen every year. In addition to fishing many visit Namdalseid to experience the beautiful mountain scenery and to do some hunting.

Namdalseid also had some industry. Hundseth Mølle is one of the largest mills in Norway, Namdal Plast AS is a factory manufacturing fiberglass products, and Pelsberederiet AS is a manufacturer of furs from moose, deer, and other wild animals.

See also
List of former municipalities of Norway

References

External links

Municipal fact sheet from Statistics Norway 
Årgårdselva: one of the best salmon rivers in Norway
Finnvollvatnet Nature Reserve: old growth forest, boreal rainforest, and rich bird life

 
Namsos
Former municipalities of Norway
1838 establishments in Norway
2020 disestablishments in Norway
Populated places disestablished in 2020